is a retired Japanese speed skater.

With two silver and one bronze medals at the World All-Round Speed Skating Championships he has been the most successful Japanese long track speed skater in all-round competitions. He was ranked 4th on the Adelskalender in February 1997. Shirahata established 22 national records and was nine times national all-round champion.

Records

Personal records

References

1973 births
Living people
Japanese male speed skaters
Olympic speed skaters of Japan
Speed skaters at the 1992 Winter Olympics
Speed skaters at the 1998 Winter Olympics
Speed skaters at the 2002 Winter Olympics
People from Kushiro, Hokkaido
World Allround Speed Skating Championships medalists
World Single Distances Speed Skating Championships medalists
20th-century Japanese people